Horstead Priory was a Benedictine alien house in Norfolk, England.

William II of England granted Horstead manor to the Abbey of Sainte-Trinité, in Caen, France, which had been founded by William's mother, Matilda of Flanders The priory was dissolved in 1414.

References

11th-century church buildings in England
1414 disestablishments in England
Christian monasteries established in the 11th century
Buildings and structures demolished in the 15th century
Monasteries in Norfolk
William II of England